= Europe–Israel Tower =

Building in Tel Aviv, Israel

Coordinates: 32°4′39.39″N 34°47′20.77″E

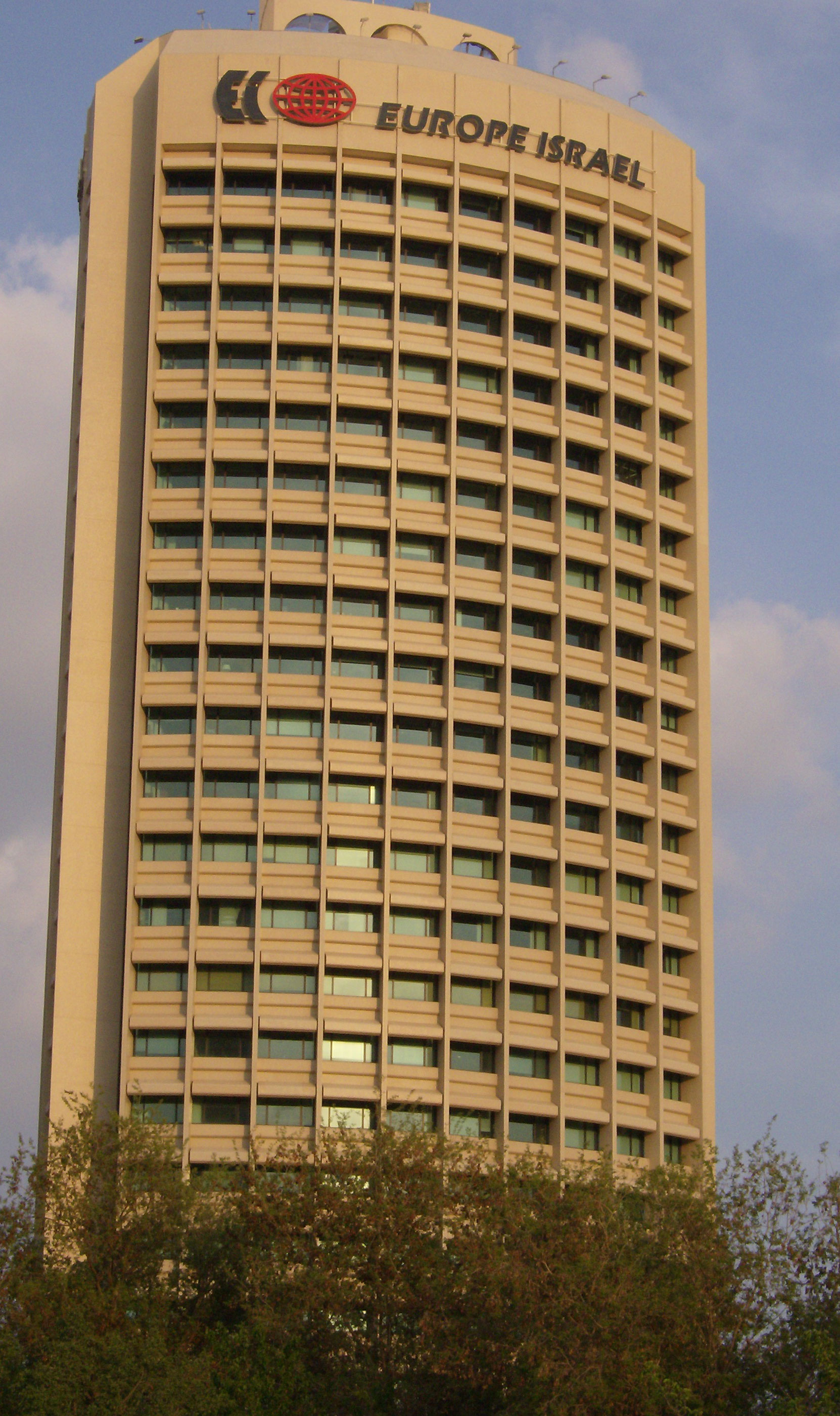
Europe-Israel Tower, Tel Aviv, 1971–1979.

The Europe–Israel Tower, also known as the IBM Tower, is a high-rise building in Tel Aviv, Israel, located at 35 King Shaul Boulevard. The building is 95 metres high and has 24 floors. It was designed by architects A. Yasky and J. Sivan and was constructed from 1974 to 1979, though the initial design process began already in 1971. The facades were intended to bring to mind a computer punch card, in reference to the clients' products. During the construction process, one floor was completed every ten days.
